On October 17, 2019, Anesha “Duffy” Murnane disappeared from Pioneer Avenue, the main thoroughfare of Homer, Alaska in the middle of the day while walking to a medical appointment. The case remained unresolved until a tip led investigators to arrest a man in Ogden, Utah for the rape and murder of Murnane.

Disappearance
Murnane resided at a small supportive housing facility in Homer. She left the building on foot at shortly after noon on October 17, 2019, headed for a local clinic, but she never arrived. She was not officially reported missing until the 19th. Search dogs were used to track her movements, they determined she apparently got into a vehicle on Pioneer Avenue. An air search was conducted, and volunteers conducted searches and went door-to-door over the next several months.

Investigation
When initial efforts to locate Murnane were not successful, the Homer Police Department hired a special investigator for the sole purpose of continuing to try and determine what happened to her. The FBI also assisted in aspects of the investigation.Several persons of interest were interviewed over the course of the next two years, including the person eventually charged with abducting and murdering Murnane, but there was not sufficient cause to make an arrest.  Dateline NBC profiled the case as part of their "Missing in America" series in February 2020.

Arrest

In April 2022, a call to a tip line gave numerous details about the crime and identified a Utah man who had formerly lived in Homer as the person who abducted, raped and murdered Murnane. He allegedly knew Murnane due to being employed by a local behavioral health service and having worked at the building where Murnane lived. He was pulled over and arrested on multiple counts in May 2022. Subsequent interviews led to the discovery that the anonymous tip came from the suspect's wife, whom he allegedly told about the murder in 2021. Upon executing search warrants on the suspect, police recovered what appears to be Murnane's Timex watch, found near a missing person flyer.

In September 2022 a grand jury indicted the suspect on multiple felony charges including murder, kidnapping, and sexual assault, carrying a possible sentence of ninety-nine years. The suspect remains in Utah, where he is also facing multiple charges.

References

2019 in Alaska
October 2019 events in the United States
2010s missing person cases
Homer, Alaska
Kidnappings in the United States
Missing person cases in Alaska